Carex quadriflora, the four-flower sedge, is a species of flowering plant in the family Cyperaceae, native to northeastern China, the Russian Far East, the Korean Peninsula, and Japan. Its chromosome number is 2n=46.

References

quadriflora
Flora of North-Central China
Flora of Manchuria
Flora of Amur Oblast
Flora of Primorsky Krai
Flora of Korea
Flora of Japan
Plants described in 1932